Saale Bulls Halle are an ice hockey team in Halle, Germany. They play in the Oberliga, the third level of ice hockey in Germany. The club was founded in 2004.

External links
Official site

Ice hockey teams in Germany
Sport in Halle (Saale)
Ice hockey clubs established in 2004
2004 establishments in Germany